The Glasgow Summer Sessions which began in 2013 is an annual series of concerts held every August at Bellahouston Park in the Southside of Glasgow, Scotland. Taking place on the last weekend of August over 2–3 nights the event attracts up to 100,000 people each year and some of the biggest names in music.

History
The festival was founded in 2013 by Geoff Ellis, DF Concerts & Live Nation UK

In its debut year of 2013 crowds of 100,000 saw Avicii, Eminem and Kings of Leon over three nights with an average of over 33,000 people per night.

August 2014 saw 60,000 attend concerts headlined by French, DJ David Guetta & Las Vegas Rockers The Killers whilst 2015 saw two 35,000 sold-out shows headlined by Scottish artists Paolo Nutini and Calvin Harris.

The 2016 Summer Sessions were Headlined by Noel Gallagher's High Flying Birds on the Friday night in front of a crowd of over 25,000. The following evening was headlined by Scottish Rockers Biffy Clyro with a Sold-Out crowd of 35,000.

On Thursday 2 March 2017 it was announced that American hip-hop star Eminem would Headline the 2017 Summer Sessions. This would be Eminem's second Summer Sessions appearance after Headlining the event in 2013. Tickets became available on Friday 3 March 2017 and as of Tuesday 21 March 2017 the show had sold out with all 35,000 tickets being snapped up.

In February 2018 Compton Rapper Kendrick Lamar performed at a sold out SSE Hydro. Upon his departure after the Gig he apologized that it had been 5 years since his last appearance in the city & vowed he would be back sooner rather than later. 24 hours after the show it was confirmed that he was headlining the Summer Session in August 2018. Tickets went on sale at the start of March and all 35,000 tickets were sold out in a few days.

List of Headliners
2019: The Cure, Foo Fighters, The 1975
2018: Kings of Leon, Catfish and the Bottlemen, Kendrick Lamar
2017: Eminem
2016: Noel Gallagher's High Flying Birds, Biffy Clyro 
2015: Paolo Nutini, Calvin Harris
2014: David Guetta, The Killers
2013: Kings of Leon, Avicii, Eminem

Line-Ups

2013

2014

2015

2016

2017

2018

2019

See also
 T in the Park
 List of music festivals in the United Kingdom

Music in Glasgow
Music festivals in Scotland